Manfred Beer (born 2 December 1953) is a former East German biathlete. During his career he won a bronze medal at the 1976 Winter Olympics as part of the East German 4 × 7.5 km relay team and two gold medals and one bronze medal in World Championships, also as part of the 4 × 7.5 km relay team.

Biathlon results
All results are sourced from the International Biathlon Union.

Olympic Games
1 medal (1 bronze)

World Championships
3 medals (2 gold, 1 bronze)

*During Olympic seasons competitions are only held for those events not included in the Olympic program.

References

External links
 
 
SGD Zinnwald

1953 births
Living people
People from Altenberg, Saxony
People from Bezirk Dresden
German male biathletes
Sportspeople from Saxony
Olympic biathletes of East Germany
Biathletes at the 1976 Winter Olympics
Medalists at the 1976 Winter Olympics
Olympic medalists in biathlon
Olympic bronze medalists for East Germany
Biathlon World Championships medalists